The Grammy Award for Best Gospel Choir or Chorus Album was awarded from 1991 to 2006.  From 1991 to 1997 it was awarded as Best Gospel Album by a Choir or Chorus. The Brooklyn Tabernacle Choir and their director, Carol Cymbala, were the most decorated artist in this category with six wins.

Years reflect the year in which the Grammy Awards were presented, for works released in the previous year.

Recipients
Years reflect the year in which the Grammy Awards were presented, for works released in the previous year.

 Each year is linked to the article about the Grammy Awards held that year.

See also
 List of Grammy Award categories

References

General
 

Specific

External links
Official site of the Grammy Awards

Grammy Awards for gospel music
Album awards